The 1901 Furman Baptists football team was an American football team that represented Furman University as an independent during the 1901 college football season. In its first season under head coach Charles Roller, Furman compiled a 1–2–1 record. The team played its home games in Greenville, South Carolina.

Schedule

References

Furman
Furman Paladins football seasons
Furman Baptists football